The Portland Pilots women's basketball team represents the University of Portland, located in Portland, Oregon, United States, in NCAA Division I basketball competition. They play their home games at the Chiles Center and are members of the West Coast Conference.

History
Portland began play in 1977. They played in the NAIA Tournament from 1983 to 1985, finishing 3rd in 1983 and losing to UNC Asheville in the 1984 final and losing in the Quarterfinals in 1985. They joined Division I in 1986 and played in the West Coast Conference beginning in 1988. They made the NCAA tournament four straight years from 1994 to 1997, winning the WCC conference title in 1994 while getting at-large bids in the next three years, going 23–7, 23–7, and 27–3 with a perfect regular season conference record in 1997, losing in the conference tournament to San Francisco each time. In 2020, they won their second conference title, which qualified them for the cancelled 2020 NCAA Tournament. They have made the Women's National Invitation Tournament in 1999 and 2009 along with two Women's Basketball Invitational appearances in 2010 and 2021.

They have lost in the first round in each of their postseason appearances, with a 67–63 loss to Washington in 1999 being their closest loss. As of the end of the 2015–16 season, the Pilots have an all-time record of 562–553.

Postseason

NCAA Division I

NAIA Division I
The Pilots made the NAIA Division I women's basketball tournament three times, with a combined record of 5–4.

References

External links